The 1972 United States presidential election in Maine took place on November 7, 1972, as part of the 1972 United States presidential election which was held throughout all fifty states and the District of Columbia. Voters chose four representatives, or electors to the Electoral College, who voted for president and vice president.

Maine was won by the incumbent Republican president Richard Nixon by a landslide 23 point margin over his Democratic challenger, Senator George McGovern of South Dakota. Nixon took 61.46% of the vote, totaling up to 256,458 votes, to McGovern’s 38.48%, and 160,584 votes. In the midst of Nixon’s massive 49-state landslide victory, Maine voted almost exactly as the country did, only voting about 0.7% more Republican than the nation as a whole.

Richard Nixon swept every county in the state except for Androscoggin, where McGovern won by a mere 103 votes. Androscoggin was the solitary county McGovern won in the Northeast outside Massachusetts or the metropolises of New York and Philadelphia.

Nixon's victory was the first of five consecutive Republican victories in the state, as Maine would not vote for a Democratic candidate again until Bill Clinton in 1992. Since then it has become a safe Democratic state, not being seriously competitive until 2016, although Republican presidential candidate Donald Trump would later win an electoral vote from Maine via its 2nd congressional district, which leans Republican, in both 2016, and in 2020.

Since 1972 no presidential candidate of either party has surpassed Nixon’s 61.46% of the vote in Maine (the closest being Ronald Reagan’s 60.83% in 1984).'

This was the first presidential election in which Maine allocated its electoral votes proportionally, giving 2 electoral votes to the overall winner of the state and 1 electoral vote to the winner of each congressional district.

Results

Results by county

See also
 United States presidential elections in Maine

References

1972
Maine
1972 Maine elections